The MY Complex Fire is a large complex of wildfires burning in Montana. The fire started near Hysham, Montana on July 9, 2021. It has so far burned  and is 0% contained.

Events

July 
The MY Complex Fire was first reported on July 9, 2021 at around 10:45 a.m. MDT near Hysham, Montana.

Cause 
The cause of the fire is believed to be due to lightning.

Containment 
As of July 12, 2021, the fire is 0% percent contained.

Impact

Closures and evacuations

References 

2021 Montana wildfires
June 2021 events in the United States
Wildfires in Montana